This is a list of notable people from Tuvalu.

 Eselealofa Apinelu
 Opetaia Foa'i
 Apisai Ielemia
 Ionatana Ionatana
 Kamuta Latasi
 Toaripi Lauti
 Tupua Leupena
 Faimalaga Luka
 Tulaga Manuella
 Bikenibeu Paeniu
 Seve Paeniu
 Tomasi Puapua
 Tomu Sione
 Saufatu Sopoanga
 Koloa Talake
 Filoimea Telito
 Fiatau Penitala Teo
 Maatia Toafa
 Lagitupu Tuilimu
 Solofa Uota

Tuvaluans
lists
Tuvaluans
Tuvalu